Skore is one of the six villages of the former commune of Pogon, in southern Albania. At the 2015 local government reform it became part of the municipality Dropull. According to a 2014 report by the Albanian government, there were 492 ethnic Greeks in the village.

Notable people 
 Nikolaos Kalyvas (1898/1900 - 1944), Greek trade unionist and deputy minister of Labour during the Axis occupation of Greece, killed by OPLA.

See also
Greeks in Albania

References

Populated places in Dropull
Greek communities in Albania